Yahşibey is a village in Dikili district of İzmir Province, Turkey. The population of the Yahşibey is 239 as of 2011.

References

Villages in Dikili District